Keyboard Sonata No. 33 (Haydn) may refer to:
Piano Sonata Hob. XVI/20, L. 33, in C minor
Piano Sonata Hob. XVI/33, L. 34, in D major